The following is a list of 2018 box office number-one films in China.

See also
List of Chinese films of 2018

References

2018
China
2018 in Chinese cinema